Merle Thorpe, Jr. (1918-Feb. 13, 1994) was an American lawyer and philanthropist. Thorpe was born in Washington DC and attended Sidwell Friends, St. Albans School and the Phillips Exeter Academy. He then earned bachelor's and law degrees from Yale University. Thorpe served as a Navy intelligence officer during World War II. After the war Thorpe joined the Washington DC law firm Hogan & Hartson, where he was a partner from 1956 to 1982. Thorpe led a number of early shareholder's rights battles. Thorpe took a trip to the Middle East with Senator William Fulbright in 1975 and afterwards Fulbright became a mentor to Thorpe about the region. Thorpe's interest in the region led him to start the Foundation for Middle East Peace in 1979. He died of cancer in 1994.

References 

1994 deaths
20th-century American lawyers
Sidwell Friends School alumni
St. Albans School (Washington, D.C.) alumni
Phillips Exeter Academy alumni
Yale Law School alumni
1918 births